Sarriko  is a station on lines 1 and 2 of the Bilbao metro. The station is located in the neighbourhood of Ibarrekolanda, part of the Deusto district. It is named after the Sarriko park located nearby. The station is in close proximity to the Faculty of Business and Economic Sciences of the University of the Basque Country as well as the conservatory of music. It was opened on 11 November 1995.

Station layout 
Unlike the other underground stations within the city, Sarriko does not follow the typical cavern-shaped layout, but it is instead made up of a big single space, with a big crystal shelter allowing sunlight to reach the platform level. It was designed by Norman Foster, with a main hall located suspended directly above the rail tracks. In 1998 it was awarded the Brunel Award to railway stations.

Access 

  2 Benidorm St. (Ibarrekolanda exit)
   2 Benidorm St (Ibarrekolanda exit)

Services 
The station is served by line 1 from Etxebarri to Ibarbengoa and Plentzia, and by line 2 from Basauri to Kabiezes. The station is also served by local Bilbobus and regional Bizkaibus bus services.

References

External links
 

Line 1 (Bilbao metro) stations
Line 2 (Bilbao metro) stations
Buildings and structures in Bilbao
Railway stations in Spain opened in 1995
1995 establishments in the Basque Country (autonomous community)